General elections were held in Azad Kashmir on 5 July 2001 to elect the members of seventh assembly of Azad Kashmir.

References

Elections in Azad Kashmir
Azad
July 2001 events in Pakistan